Marche à l'ombre is the fourth studio album by French singer-songwriter Renaud, released in 1980 by Polydor Records. It is the first of Renaud's album that officially has a title, his three first albums being unnamed.

Marche à l'ombre contains three of Renaud's most popular songs:: "Marche à l'ombre" contains observations and aspersions cast on various characters who walk into the narrator's favorite bar as he relaxes with a pinball-obsessed friend. "Les Aventures de Gérard Lambert" is the tale of a fictional comic hero, a mobylette rider whose evening is ruined by a mechanical problem and a wise-cracking passerby. "Dans mon HLM" is a floor-by-floor description of the public housing block that Renaud lived in, from the nightwatchman on the ground floor to his girlfriend on the eighth floor.

"It Is Not Because You Are" also gained attention as a spoof attempt to sing in English. A mock ballad, it is a tortured variety of Franglais, with almost every line containing both English and French words.

"La Teigne" is the story of a youth who has grown up "on the state" ("Il était de l'assistance") who can't make friends and who commits suicide before his 20th birthday. "Baston" (French for "punch-up") tells the story of a person who aims to die young.

Track listing
All songs were written by Renaud Séchan except where noted.

Side one
 "Marche à l'ombre" – 3:16
 "Les aventures de Gérard Lambert" (Renaud Séchan, Alain Ranval) – 3:46
 "Dans mon H.L.M." – 6:00
 "La teigne" – 2:43
 "Où c'est qu'j'ai mis mon flingue?" – 3:03

Side two
 "It Is Not Because You Are" – 3:20
 "Baston!" (Renaud Séchan, Michel Roy) – 5:30
 "Mimi l'ennui" – 3:56
 "L'auto-stoppeuse" – 3:07
 "Pourquoi d'abord?" – 3:21

Tracks 1 and 3 were included on the compilation The Meilleur of Renaud (75–85). Tracks 1, 3 and 6 were also included on the CD Ma Compil. Tracks 1, 3, 5 and 6 were covered for the tribute album La Bande à Renaud.

Personnel

 Renaud Séchan – vocals
 Alain Ranval – guitar, background vocals
 Pierre "Pierrot" Chérèze – guitar
 Patrice Meyer – guitar
 Laurent De Gaspéris – guitar, background vocals
 Alain Marquez – guitar
 Gérard Prévost – bass
 Amaury Blanchard – drums
 Steve Sheshan – percussion
 Jean-Philippe Goude – keyboards, piano, harpsichord
 Laurent Gérôme – pedal steel guitar
 Guy Khalifa – flute, piano, background vocals
 Richard Raux – saxophone
 Alain Guillard – saxophone
 Yvon Guillard – trumpet
 David Rose – violin
 Monique Rollin – lute
 Daniel Neuranter – bassoon
 Lou "Léon" Gamme – alto flute
 Phillippe Vauville – background vocals
 Klaus Blasquiz – background vocals
 Shitty Télaouine – background vocals
 Stella Vander – background vocals
 Liza "Deluxe" Bois – background vocals
 Yves Poucel – background vocals (English)
 Hubert Varron - string conductor

References

1980 albums
Renaud albums
Polydor Records albums